The Prudnik Silesian dialect is a Silesian dialect, used in the parts of Prudnik County (Niemysłowice, Czyżowice, Rudziczka, Piorunkowice, Gmina Biała, Gmina Głogówek), Nysa County (Ścinawa Nyska, Pleśnica, Przydroże Małe, Puszyna, Piechocice, Stara Jamka, Rzymkowice), Głubczyce County (Klisino, Pomorzowice, Pomorzowiczki, Ściborzyce Małe, Kietlice, Królowe, Biernatów, Lisięcice, Nowe Sady) and Krapkowice County (Krapkowice, Nowy Dwór Prudnicki, Kórnica, Ściborowice, Borek, Pietna, Żużela, Żywocice, Gwoździce), now in Poland. Some linguists consider it a dialect of Silesian, some of the Polish language.

It is closely related to the Niemodlin dialect.

Example of the dialect

References 

Polish dialects
Silesian language